Brooke Group Ltd. v. Brown & Williamson Tobacco Corp., 509 U.S. 209 (1993), was a United States Supreme Court case in which the court required that an antitrust plaintiff alleging predatory pricing must show not only changes in market conditions adverse to its interests, as a threshold matter, but must show on the merits that (1) the prices complained of are below an appropriate measure of its rival's costs, and (2) that the competitor had a reasonable prospect or a "dangerous probability" of recouping its investment in the alleged scheme.

Holding
An oligopoly's interdependent pricing may provide a means for achieving recoupment, and thus may form the basis of a primary-line injury claim. Predatory pricing schemes, in general, are implausible, and are even more improbable when they require coordinated action among several firms. They are least likely to occur where, as alleged here, the cooperation among firms is tacit, since effective tacit coordination is difficult to achieve.  

Since there is a high likelihood that any attempt by one oligopolist to discipline a rival by cutting prices will produce an outbreak of competition; and since a predator's present losses fall on it alone, while the later supracompetitive profits must be shared with every other oligopolist in proportion to its market share, including the intended victim.  

Ultimately, Justice Kennedy, held that: 
 There is no per se rule of nonliability under Robinson-Patman Act for predatory price discrimination when recoupment is alleged to take place through supracompetitive oligopoly pricing, but 
 Competitor's alleged below-cost sales of generic cigarettes through discriminatory volume rebates did not create competitive injury in violation of Robinson-Patman Act.

See also 
 Weyerhaeuser Co. v. Ross-Simmons Hardwood Lumber Co. (applying the same analysis to "predatory buying")

External links
 

United States antitrust case law
United States Supreme Court cases
1993 in United States case law
United States tobacco case law
Brown & Williamson
United States Supreme Court cases of the Rehnquist Court
History of Louisville, Kentucky